Nizhneye Anisimovo is a rural locality (a village) in Opokskoye Rural Settlement, Velikoustyugsky District, Vologda Oblast, Russia. The population was 10 as of 2002.

Geography 
Nizhneye Anisimovo is located 54 km southwest of Veliky Ustyug (the district's administrative centre) by road. Verkhneye Anisimovo is the nearest rural locality.

References 

Rural localities in Velikoustyugsky District